Stalingrad is a former name of Volgograd, a city in Russia.

Stalingrad may also refer to:

Related to the city
 Battle of Stalingrad, a battle in 1942–1943 widely considered the turning point in the European theatre of World War II
 Stalingrad Oblast, former name of Volgograd Oblast, an administrative division of Russia

Arts and entertainment

Films
(All set in the Battle of Stalingrad)
 Stalingrad (1943 film), a Soviet propaganda film
 Stalingrad: Dogs, Do You Want to Live Forever?, film made in West Germany and released in 1959
 Stalingrad (1990 film), a Soviet war film
 Stalingrad (1993 film), a German anti-war film following the fate of German soldiers
 Stalingrad (2013 film), a Russian film, part love story

Music 
 Stalingrad (Eternal Flame album) (1988)
 Stalingrad (Accept album) (2012)
"Stalingrad", a song by Swedish metal band Sabaton from the album Primo Victoria
"Stalingrad", a song by Russian-sung Finnish metal band KYPCK from the album Cherno

Other 
 Stalingrad (painting), an oil painting by Danish artist Asger Jorn
 Stalingrad (1948 novel), by Theodor Plievier, and the two television adaptations of it
 Stalingrad (Grossman novel), a 1952 novel by Vasily Grossman
 Stalingrad (Beevor book), a non-fiction book by Antony Beevor published in 1998
 Stalingrad (wargame), a table top wargame, published by Avalon Hill in 1963
 Stalingrad (2005 video game), a real-time strategy computer game

Other uses
 Stalingrad legal defense, a strategy used by a defendant to wear down the plaintiff or legal proceedings.
 Stalingrad-class battlecruiser, a cancelled Soviet dreadnought warship
 , a Soviet steamship active in the World War II Arctic convoys, and sunk in 1942
 Stalingrad (Paris Métro), a metro station in Paris, France
 2250 Stalingrad, an asteroid discovered in 1972 by Tamara Smirnova

See also 
 Starigrad (disambiguation)